Theopropus elegans, common name banded flower mantis, is a species of praying mantis native to Southeast Asia.

Until their first moult, nymphs have red and black exoskeletons that aid them in ant mimicry.  They are green and white starting at their second instar and adults are similar in size and appearance to Creobroter species. Adult females are up to 5 cm in length while males only grow to 3 cm in length due to the sexual dimorphism common in mantises.  Both sexes have green and white spots with bright orange hind wings and a large white transverse stripe on the forewings.

Individual T. elegans hatched from a single ootheca and reared under the same conditions can show color variation between tones of red, green, and yellow.  Individuals can also change their color in as little as a week.

See also
List of mantis genera and species
Flower mantis

References

Hymenopodidae
Mantodea of Southeast Asia
Insects of Laos
Insects of Malaysia
Insects of Thailand
Insects of Vietnam
Insects of Myanmar
Insects of Cambodia
Insects of Singapore
Insects described in 1832
Taxa named by John O. Westwood